Events in the year 1942 in Portugal.

Incumbents
President: Óscar Carmona
Prime Minister: António de Oliveira Salazar

Events
8 February - Presidential election.
1 November – Portuguese legislative election, 1942.

Arts and entertainment
September 1 – António Lobo Antunes, Portuguese novelist and physician

Sports

Births

1 September – António Lobo Antunes, novelist and medical doctor
29 December – Manuel Rodrigues, footballer

Full date missing
Jaime Graça, footballer (died 2012)

Deaths

References

 
1940s in Portugal
Portugal
Years of the 20th century in Portugal
Portugal